Jason Jimenez (born May 1, 1980) is a former professional gridiron football offensive tackle. He last played for the Hamilton Tiger-Cats.  He is a former member of the 2006 Grey Cup champions, the BC Lions of the CFL. He went to The University of Southern Mississippi where he earned joint degrees in Political science and Criminal justice while playing for the Southern Mississippi Golden Eagles. He graduated from Cypress Creek HS in Orlando Fl. In 2021, Jason has a wife and 2 kids, he is currently a principal at Legacy Middle School in Florida.

Professional career
In 2003, Jimenez played on the practice squad for the Cleveland Browns, Oakland Raiders and Green Bay Packers of the NFL. He was signed by the Packers in January 2004 and released in September 2004. The Raiders assigned him to the Cologne Centurions of NFL Europe in 2005. The BC Lions signed him on January 31, 2006. In 2008, he was named a CFL All-Star.

On January 29, 2010, Jimenez was released by the Lions after playing 71 games over a four-year period.

Jimenez signed as a free agent with the Hamilton Tiger-Cats on February 23, 2010. Terms of the deal were not disclosed.

.

Controversy

Jason Jimenez is considered to be one of the nicest players in the CFL.  While a member of the BC Lions, he was involved in an incident that resulted in a fixed butt to Calgary Stampeders player Anthony Gargiulo, who never played another game. Jimenez was suspended by the CFL for one game but later successfully appealed the suspension.  Later, while playing with the Hamilton Tiger Cats, Jimenez was accused of making a very legal late hit from behind to the knee of a former teammate which resulted in a fine.

External links 
Jason Jimenez at ticats.ca

1980 births
American players of Canadian football
BC Lions players
Canadian football offensive linemen
Cleveland Browns players
Cologne Centurions (NFL Europe) players
Frankfurt Galaxy players
Hamilton Tiger-Cats players
Living people
Oakland Raiders players
Southern Miss Golden Eagles football players
Sportspeople from Queens, New York
Players of American football from New York City
Green Bay Packers players